Phantom is the fourth extended play (EP) by Chinese boy band WayV with The Phantom of the Opera-inspired lead single of the same name. It was released by Label V and SM Entertainment on December 28, 2022. Consisting of six new songs and two bonus tracks that fall mostly in R&B and hip hop with influences from trap and classical music, the album saw participation from frequent collaborators, namely Adrian McKinnon, LDN Noise, Mike Daley, Mitchell Owens, Ryan S. Jhun as well as first collaboration with the McDonough brothers of Before You Exit. Released almost two years from their previous EP, Phantom marks the group's first album release as a sextet, following suspension of Lucas in August 2021. WayV was set to embark on an eponymous global fanmeeting tour to support the album, with stops including Seoul, Manila, and Bangkok.

Background and release 
Following the release of their third EP, Kick Back, in March 2021, WayV were focused on sub-unit activities. The first sub-unit consisting Kun and Xiaojun released the pop-ballad single "Back to You" in June 2021, while Ten and Yangyang released the hip-hop single "Low Low" in August. The third sub-unit consisting Lucas and Hendery that had been scheduled to release the single "Jalapeño" in the same month was canceled due to Lucas' cheating and gaslighting controversy. He was then suspended from any promotional activities. In December 2021, WayV members participated in NCT's third studio album, Universe, by recording the English song "Miracle" as a quintet: Winwin was away in China after establishing a personal studio to pursue an acting career.

On November 22, 2022, WayV posted a teaser image announcing the release of their fourth EP, Phantom, on December 9, after nearly two years from their previous EP. The image showed only six silhouettes, confirming member Lucas's absence in the EP, making it their first album release as a sextet. The release was later postponed due to the national mourning period following the passing of former president of China Jiang Zemin. On December 8, the group announced December 28 as the new release date. A short music video for the b-side track "Diamonds Only" was released ahead of the release on December 22. A short music video for "Good Life" and a live clip for "Broken Love" were also released on January 9 and 16, 2023, respectively.

Composition and lyrics 
The EP opens with the eponymous lead single "Phantom", a trap hip-hop based dance-pop song with string sounds and a chorus overlaid with Gregorian chants. Co-composed by frequent collaborator, Adrian McKinnon, the lyrics use masks as the fundamental lyrical motif, describing adversity and suffering as Phantom as well as expressing the will to overcome instead of being swayed by them. The following song "Diamonds Only" is a progressive R&B hip-hop song, with lyrics equating long-cherished dreams and love with shining and precious diamonds. The third track "Good Life" is a mid-tempo R&B, produced by the McDonough brothers of the American pop rock band Before You Exit. It tells a story about moving towards a better life. The song is followed by the ballad song "Broken Love" which likens a past love story with a jigsaw puzzle that can't be put together. The fifth song "Bounce Back" is dance-pop track with minimal instrumental that continues the sad love story from the group's previous songs, "Say It", "Come Back", and "Unbreakable". The following song "Try My Luck" is a dance track that samples Mozart's "Requiem (Dies irae)", prefacing it with an air-raid siren. The EP is then closed by two previously released sub-unit songs as bonus tracks: "Back to You", a delicate yet robust ballad with melancholy trumpet and chimes, and the summery up-tempo hip-hop dance track "Low Low".

Promotion

Singles 
The music video of the lead single "Phantom" was released at the same day as the album on December 28, 2022. It features elements from Andrew Lloyd Webber's The Phantom of the Opera, such as candelabras, masks and broken chandeliers, as well as Game of Thrones-inspired sword-covered throne. Divyansha Dongre of Rolling Stone India described "Phantom" as a "fine addition" to WayV's discography that "perfectly accentuates the group's vocal tones" and features an "evocative" choreography.
The song debuted at number sixteen on Chinese TME UNI chart.

Live performances 
To commemorate the release, WayV held a special live broadcast, titled WayV "Phantom" Countdown, on December 28. A pretaped performance of "Phantom" was also broadcast on JTBC's Music Universe K-909 on the same day. WayV performed "Phantom" along with their old songs "Love Talk" and "Take Off" at SM Entertainment's yearly online concert, SMCU Palace at Kwangya. The group also performed the English version of "Phantom" without Winwin in various South Korean music shows, namely M Countdown, Music Bank, Show! Music Core, and Inkigayo.

Fanmeeting tour 
On January 10, 2023, WayV announced that they would embark on an eponymous global fanmeeting tour, starting with two shows at Kyung Hee University's Grand Peace Palace in Seoul on February 11. Beside performing songs from Phantom, the group also performed their previous songs, such as "Kick Back", "Dream Launch", "Action Figure", "Love Talk", and "Nectar". The fanmeeting featured playful corners and games, as well as SM Dance Medley, featuring NCT Dream's "Candy", Shinee's "Sherlock (Clue + Note)", and Aespa's "Illusion".

Tour dates

Commercial performance 
Upon its release, Phantom continued WayV's success on South Korean Circle Chart by sitting at number one on the chart for the second time in a row and ranked at number fourteen on the monthly chart with 99,019 copies sold. The album also debuted at number four on Oricon's physical album chart with 9,337 copies sold and number five on Billboard Japan Hot Albums.

Track listing

Charts

Weekly charts

Monthly charts

References 

2022 EPs
WayV albums
SM Entertainment EPs
IRiver EPs
Mandarin-language albums